Folk + or Folk Plus is a music channel that broadcasts Albanian folklore music of the Albanian-speaking regions. It broadcasts daily for 24 hours exclusively in Tring terrestrial and satellite digital platform.

See also 
 Television in Albania
 Communication in Albania
 Vizion Plus
 TV Klan
 Tip TV
 FAX News

References

Digitalb television networks
Mass media in Tirana